Keasey is a former settle in Columbia County, Oregon, United States. It was named after settler Eden W. Keasey, who was also first postmaster of the post office, which operated from August 5, 1890 to 1955. There are no remains of the original community due to the destruction of the Portland, Astoria & Pacific Railroad.

References

1890 establishments in Oregon
Populated places established in 1890
Former populated places in Oregon by county